The Palo Alto Medical Foundation for Health Care, Research, and Education (PAMF) is a not-for-profit health care organization with medical offices in more than 15 cities in the Bay Area. It has more than 900 physicians and had over 2 million patient visits in 2008.

History
The history of the group dates back to 1930, when Dr. Russel Van Arsdale Lee founded the Palo Alto Medical Clinic (PAMC). Within a few years, several physicians joined Dr. Lee, including Edward F. Roth, Blake C. Wilbur, Herbert Niebel, Milton Saier and Esther Clark, one of the first female physicians in the country. In 1946 — before health plans were standard business — PAMC agreed to provide medical care to nearby Stanford University students in exchange for a flat fee. In 1950, it became one of the first facilities in the nation to offer radiation therapy for cancer patients in an outpatient setting.

In 1981, the for-profit physician group PAMC created the not-for-profit PAMF to control its operations and assets, and in 1993, PAMF became an affiliate of Sutter Health, a not-for-profit organization with hospitals and medical groups in Northern California. In 1999, it was a very early adopter of an electronic health record system. In 2008, PAMF's three medical groups — Camino Medical Group, Palo Alto Medical Clinic, and Santa Cruz Medical Clinic — merged to form a single medical group, Palo Alto Foundation Medical Group (PAFMG). In 2017, the Peninsula Medical Clinic (PMC) of Burlingame joined PAFMG as the Mills Peninsula Division of the medical group.

Education and research
In addition to its Health Care Division, PAMF consists of an Education Division and Research Institute. The Education Division provides classes, lectures, support groups and consultations, and manages PAMF's Community Health Resource Centers located in several Bay Area cities. The Research Institute, located in Palo Alto, has more than 30 staff members conducting clinical studies in four departments: health services, clinical research, health policy research, and cardiovascular physiology and biophysics. In 2009, the National Institutes of Health awarded the institute more than $2 million in federal stimulus grants through the American Recovery and Reinvestment Act.
 
PAMF provides an e-health service that allows patients to view their records and test results from their personal computers, and request appointments and prescription renewals online. In 2008, it launched a pilot program to promote online communication between diabetic patients and their health care providers.

Structure
PAMF is a multi-specialty group practice, comprising physicians from all of the usual specialties. It is part of the Sutter Health Bay Area Operating Unit, which also includes Mills Peninsula Health Services, Menlo Park Surgical Hospital, and Sutter Maternity and Surgical Center of Santa Cruz. PAMF is governed by the Sutter Health Peninsula Coastal Region Board of Directors and a Community Board of Trustees. Its physicians are led by the Palo Alto Medical Foundation Group Board of Directors. The group's administration is headed by a Chief Executive Officer, and presidents of the five geographical divisions: Santa Cruz, Palo Alto, Camino, Alameda and Mills Peninsula.

Awards
In 1980, Anne A. Scitovsky, longtime affiliate researcher and economist, was elected a member of the National Academy of Medicine
In 1983, Robert W. Jamplis, president and CEO (1981–1999) of the foundation, was elected to the National Academy of Medicine
In 2009, PAMF was named a top performer by the Integrated Healthcare Association, which ranks California medical groups on clinical quality, patient experience, use of information technology and coordinated diabetes care.
In 2009, its Chief Medical Information Officer, Dr. Paul Tang, was listed on Modern Healthcare's list of 100 Most Powerful People in Healthcare.

References

External links
 PAMF Web Site
 Sutter Health Web Site

Clinics in California
Medical and health foundations in the United States
Healthcare in the San Francisco Bay Area
Sutter Health
Non-profit organizations based in Palo Alto, California